Neeru river or Neru river is the river tributary of the Chenab River, beginning at the Sonbain Ashapati Glacier of the Bhaderwah and joining the Chenab at Pul Doda in the Doda district. The Gupt Ganga temple of Bhaderwah is located on the bank of this river.

Origin
Neeru river originates from the Sonabain Glacier in Bhaderwah of Jammu and Kashmir.

Geography
The Neeru river flows through Bhaderwah valley and joins river Chenab at Pul Doda.

Gupt Ganga temple
The historic Shiv temple, which is entirely composed of stone slabs, is located 0.5 km to the east of the town on the bank of the river Neeru. Long stone slabs were used in its construction, which is similar to that of a tomb. Here, Ganga abruptly collapses onto the Lingam before vanishing. There is a Bhimsen footprint on a rock inside the temple. During their Agyat-Vaas, the Pandavas are believed to have used a long cave to go from Bhadarwah to Kashmir. One of the well-known historical pilgrimage sites in Bhaderwah is Gupt Ganga. The water from the inside then flows to a "Bawali" (Pond) where visitors, devout individuals, and sadhus take a bath. The Bawali's water is cool in the summer and warm in the winter.

References

External links
 Niru River, OpenStreetMap, retrieved 24 February 2023.

Rivers of Jammu and Kashmir